The Portland Railway, Light and Power Company (PRL&P) was a railway company and electric power utility in Portland, Oregon, United States, from 1906 until 1924.

History

A series of mergers of various transportation companies in 1905–1906 culminating in the merger of the Portland Street Railway Company; Oregon Water, Power and Railway Company; and the Portland General Electric Company on June 28, 1906, established the Portland Railway, Light and Power Company (PRL&P). Nearly 200 miles of track and 375 urban and interurban streetcars were thereupon consolidated under a single company. Upon its formation, PRL&P became the only company to operate streetcars within Portland city limits; it also continued to sell electric power.  The name, Portland General Electric (PGE), remained in use as a division of PRL&P and, after subsequent reorganizations in 1930 and 1940 eventually PGE became once again fully independent as a power utility company, making PGE in some ways both an ancestor and a descendant of PRL&P.

The company's interurban lines used standard-gauge track, with the exception of the line to Vancouver, Washington, while most of its urban (or "city") lines were narrow-gauge, specifically 3 ft 6 in (1067 mm) gauge.  A few lines in the southeast part of the city were standard-gauge, converted from narrow gauge in December 1908 for efficiency, so that they could operate out of PRL&P's Sellwood carbarn, which was closer to the area those lines served but was only equipped for standard-gauge operation.

By 1910, PRL&P was a $15 million holding company, having received 43 franchises from the city of Portland, mostly in the form of land grants. It was a monopoly, and "liable to anti-trust action under the Sherman Act." The company only installed safety devices (such as pedestrian bumpers) on its streetcars after "extreme public pressure." While PRL&P installed many public streetlights, the city council complained about the power rates charged to the city.

PRL&P's president, Franklin Griffith, was part of the corruption and graft surrounding Mayor George Luis Baker; Griffith and others paid off Baker's mortgage.

PRL&P was reorganized as the Portland Electric Power Company (PEPCO) on April 26, 1924.

Two former PRL&P streetcar buildings are listed on the National Register of Historic Places.  Bay E of the West Ankeny Carbarns was listed in 1978, and the Sellwood Division Carbarn Office and Clubhouse was listed in 2002.  The company's 1911 hydroelectric facility in Estacada, Oregon, the River Mill Hydroelectric Project, is also listed on the NRHP.

See also
Portland General Electric
Transportation in Oregon

References

Further reading

External links
 

Oregon railroads
Electric power companies of the United States
Streetcars in Oregon
Electric railways in Oregon
Transportation in Portland, Oregon
History of Portland, Oregon
Portland General Electric
1906 establishments in Oregon
History of transportation in Oregon
3 ft 6 in gauge railways in the United States
Standard gauge railways in the United States
Tram, urban railway and trolley companies